The Yushan Range, formerly the  and also known as the JadeMountain Range, is a mountain range in the central-southern region of Taiwan Island. It spans Chiayi County, Kaohsiung City, and Nantou County. It faces the Central Mountain Range on the east, and is separated by the Qishan River from the Alishan Range which is on the west of the Yushan Range. The Yushan Range is one of the five major ranges on Taiwan.

The Yushan Range is shaped somewhat like a crucifix, with a relatively short east to west ridge and a relatively long north to south ridge. Yushan National Park is located around some parts of the Yushan Range.

List of peaks 

There are 22 peaks taller than  among the Yushan Range, including 12 of the "top 100 peaks of Taiwan" (台灣百岳):
 Yushan Main Peak (玉山主峰), 
 Yushan Eastern Peak (玉山東峰), 
 Yushan Northern Peak (玉山北峰), 
 Yushan Southern Peak (玉山南峰), 
 Dongxiaonanshan (東小南山), 
 Yushan Western Peak (玉山西峰), 
 Nanyushan (南玉山), 
 Badongguanshan (八通關山), 
 Jundashan (郡大山), 
 Yushan Forward Peak (玉山前峰), 
 Xiluandashan (西巒大山), 
 Lushan (鹿山),

See also 

 List of mountains in Taiwan
 List of islands by highest point

References

Citations

Bibliography

 

Mountain ranges of Taiwan
Landforms of Chiayi County
Landforms of Kaohsiung
Landforms of Nantou County